Sir Thomas Willes Chitty, 1st Baronet (24 June 1855 – 15 February 1930) was a British judge, barrister, and legal scholar. From 1901 to 1920, he was a Master of the King's Bench Division, High Court of Justice. From 1920 to 1926, he served as the King's Remembrancer; the oldest judicial position in continual existence. He was knighted in the 1919 New Year Honours and made a baronet as Baronet Chitty in the 1924 New Year Honours.

Personal life
Chitty was a Freemason. He was a member of the Royal Colonial Institute Lodge (3556). He served at various times as Deputy Master of his Masonic Lodge and Grand Registrar (the principal legal officer) of the United Grand Lodge of England.

Selected works

References

1855 births
1930 deaths
Masters of the High Court (England and Wales)
British barristers
British legal scholars
Knights Bachelor
Baronets in the Baronetage of the United Kingdom
Freemasons of the United Grand Lodge of England
Chitty family